Saria Fouad Al Sayegh (born 28 August 1985) is a Lebanese footballer and former futsal player who plays as a forward for Lebanese club Stars Association for Sports (SAS), of whom she is also chairman.

Al Sayegh represented Lebanon internationally in both football and futsal.

Club career 
Al Sayegh played for Sadaka in the Lebanese Women's Football League between 2008 and 2014, winning the league title six times and the domestic cup five times. Between 2008 and 2010, she suffered an ankle injury, keeping her unavailable for play. She then established Stars Association for Sports (SAS) in 2014.

International career
Al Sayegh has been capped for Lebanon at senior level in both football and futsal. In football, she represented Lebanon at the 2014 AFC Women's Asian Cup qualification in 2013, where she played three games and scored two goals against Kuwait.

In futsal, Al Sayegh played for Lebanon at the 2008 WAFF Women's Futsal Championship.

Career statistics

International
Scores and results list Lebanon's goal tally first, score column indicates score after each Al Sayegh goal.

Honours
Lebanon
 WAFF Women's Championship third place: 2007

See also
 List of Lebanon women's international footballers

References

External links
 
 

1985 births
Living people
People from Aley District
Lebanese women's footballers
Lebanese women's futsal players
Women's association football forwards
Lebanon women's international footballers
Lebanese Women's Football League players
Sadaka SC women's footballers
Stars Association for Sports players